Mimachrostia costafasciata is a moth of the family Erebidae first described by Michael Fibiger in 2008. It is known in northern Vietnam. Adults have been found in September. The wingspan is about 15 mm. The forewing is relatively narrow and light brown, with prominent black spots only at the costa and a hardly visible narrow, beige reniform stigma. The antemedian and postmedian lines are well marked only at the costa. The subterminal line is indistinct. The terminal line is marked by brown interveinal spots. The hindwing is greyish brown with an indistinct discal spot. The underside of the upper forewing is part brownish, but otherwise grey brown, without a pattern. The underside of the upper hindwing is brownish, although the lower part is light grey, with a postmedian line and a discal spot.

References

Micronoctuini
Moths described in 2008